The 4th Division was an infantry division of the British Army, which was first formed in 1809 and disbanded for the final time in 2012. The division was commanded by a general officer commanding (GOC). In this role, the GOC received orders from a level above him in the chain of command, and then used the forces within the division to undertake the mission assigned. In addition to directing the tactical battle in which the division was involved, the GOC oversaw a staff and the administrative, logistical, medical, training, and discipline of the division. The division had 63 different permanent GOCs over its history that spanned 203 years

Prior to 1809, the British Army did not use divisional formations. As the British military grew in size during the Napoleonic Wars, the need arose for such an implementation in order to better organise forces for administrative, logistical, and tactical reasons. The 4th Division was formed on 18 June 1809 by Lieutenant-General Arthur Wellesley, and served in the Peninsular War (part of the Napoleonic Wars). During this period, three of the division's commanding officers were wounded. Major-General Galbraith Lowry Cole was wounded on two separate occasions, while leading the division. After the Peninsular War ended in 1814, the division was disbanded only to be re-raised the following year when the War of the Seventh Coalition broke out. It then fought at the Battle of Waterloo, and was disbanded the same year when the Napoleonic Wars concluded. 

It was next raised for service in the Crimean War (1853–1856). During the Battle of Inkerman (5 November 1854), the division had four different commanding officers, with two killed in action. Following the end of the war, in 1856, the division was disbanded. Forty-three years later, in 1899, the division was reformed to take part in the Second Boer War. Lieutenant-General William Penn Symons, who initially led the division, was wounded in action and subsequently taken prisoner. When the need for divisions subsided, the following year, the division was broken-up to provide garrisons for various static locations.

In 1902, a new 4th Division was formed as a permanent standing formation and not for a particular crisis. During the 20th century, the division fought in the First and Second World Wars. Major-General Louis Lipsett, the division's penultimate commander during the First World War, was killed in action shortly before the war ended in November 1918. In the post-Second World War years, it formed part of the British Army of the Rhine in Germany. During the 1960s, Major-General Jean Allard became the first Canadian to command a British Army division when he was appointed to lead the 4th. In 1978, the infantry division was transformed into an armoured formation. It maintained this role until the division was disbanded in 1993, when the British Army was downsized following the end of the Cold War. It was re-raised in 1996 as an administrative formation and maintained this role until 2012, when it was disbanded for the final time.

General officer commanding

Notes

References

 
 
 
 
 
 
 
 
 
 
 
 
 
 
 
 
 
 
 

British Army personnel by war
British Army personnel of the Napoleonic Wars
British Army personnel of the Peninsular War
British Army personnel of the Crimean War
British Army personnel of the Second Boer War
British Army personnel of World War I
British Army personnel of World War II
British Army general officer commanding lists